Berd Rocks is a natural monuments in Iskitimsky District of Novosibirsk Oblast, Russia. Its area is 26.7 hectares.

Flora
87 species of vascular plants were registered here, 7 of these species are listed in the Novosibirsk Oblast Red Data Book: Asplenium ruta-muraria, Asplenium septentrionale, Tulipa patens, Erythronium sibiricum, Cerastium maximum, Cypripedium macranthos, Gagea fedtschenkoana.

Fauna
19 species of mammals, 48 species of birds, 2 species of lizards and over 300 species of invertebrates live here. Of particular interest is the insects, which is poorly studied.

Species listed in the Novosibirsk Oblast Red Data Book: Gray marmot, European honey buzzard, Ural owl, Hawfinch, butterflies Apollo and Swallowtail, dragonflies Detka pyatnoglazy and Macromia amphigena fraenata.

External links
A. L. Mugako. Natural Monuments: Ulantova Gora, Rocky Steppe near the village of Novososedovo, Barsukovskaya Cave, Berd Rocks.

Landforms of Novosibirsk Oblast
Natural monuments of Russia
Rock formations of Russia